The Atari Lynx is a 16-bit handheld game console developed by Atari Corporation and designed by Epyx, released in North America in 1989, with a second revision called Lynx II being also released worldwide on July 1991. It was the second and last handheld console to be released under the Atari brand, succeeding the handheld iteration of Touch Me from 1978. The following list contains all of the games released for the Lynx.

Unveiled at the January's 1989 Winter Consumer Electronics Show as the Handy before being rechristened as the Lynx, the system was released to compete with 8-bit and 16-bit handheld consoles such as the Game Boy, Game Gear and TurboExpress, initially starting off successfully. Due to stiff competition in the home console market at the time, Atari Corp. focused their resources into the Atari Jaguar before ceasing internal game development in 1996 and eventually discontinuing the platform. Around 73 titles were officially released on cartridge during the system's life span on the market, with 3 more titles being released after its discontinuation by Telegames. Originally released at US$179.99, Atari dropped the price to $99.99 when the Lynx II was launched. Its unknown how many Lynx units were sold but it has been suggested that between 1 and 3 million units were sold in total. Also listed are the unlicensed aftermarket (homebrew) titles.

Commercially released games 
Listed here are all  officially released Atari Lynx games.

Unlicensed games 
There are currently  unlicensed games on this list.

See also 
 List of cancelled Atari Lynx games
 Lists of video games

Notes

References

External links 
 List of Atari Lynx games at MobyGames

Atari Lynx